The Sony Xperia X is an Android smartphone produced by Sony. Part of the Sony Xperia X series, the device was unveiled along with the Sony Xperia XA and Sony Xperia X Performance at MWC 2016 on February 22, 2016. The Sony Xperia X series will replace the former Sony Xperia Z series, as confirmed by Sony Mobile's senior product marketing manager Jun Makino in February 2016.

At the 2017 Investor Day event, Sony announced it would be dropping its "premium standard" phones (one step below the flagship premium models), including the Xperia X and X Compact.  The flagship X Performance and XZ phones will continue, as well as the XA1, XA1 Ultra, and the upcoming XZ1 and XZ1 Compact.

Specifications

Hardware

The device features a  1080p screen and a 64-bit 1.8 GHz hexa-core Qualcomm Snapdragon 650 system-on-chip with 3 GB of RAM. The device also has 32 GB and 64 GB (dual-sim variant) of internal storage with microSD card expansion up to 200 GB and includes a non-removable 2620 mAh battery.

The rear-facing camera of the Xperia X is 23 megapixels with a sensor size of 1/2.3 inch and an aperture of f/2.0, featuring a Sony Exmor RS image sensor with quick launch and predictive hybrid autofocus that utilizes phase detection autofocus that can focus on the object within 0.03 seconds.

The front facing camera is 13MP with a 1/3" EXMOR RS for mobile sensor and has a 22mm equivalent F2.2 lens.

The phone features QNOVO adaptive battery charging technology which aims to extend the lifespan of the battery.

The rear (back) camera has hardware issues that could result in it not functioning. Users within the product warranty are entitled to a manufacturer repair.

Software
The Xperia X is preinstalled with Android 6.0.1 Marshmallow with Sony's custom interface and software. On August 23, 2016, Sony announced that the Xperia X would receive an upgrade to Android 7.1.1 Nougat. On December 19, 2016, the Android 7.0 Nougat update for the Xperia X has officially rolled out. In June 2017, Sony released Android 7.1.1 Nougat for the Xperia X. Sailfish OS, announced to proceed to community beta phase during July 2017, has been released, and is available in select countries since October 11, 2017. On 6 February 2018 Xperia X has received an official Android 8.0 Oreo update. Ubuntu Touch can also be installed on the Xperia X.

Variants 

Here is a partial description of the Xperia X variants (X, X dual sim, X Compact) sold in the world:

See also 
Sony Xperia XA
Sony Xperia XZ
Sony Xperia X Performance
Sony Xperia C5 Ultra
Sony Xperia C4

References

External links 

Official Press Release
Introducing the first ”X” series smartphones – Xperia X, Xperia X Performance and Xperia XA featuring new camera and battery technology
Official Whitepaper 
Official Whitepaper (Dual SIM version) 

Android (operating system) devices
Sony smartphones
Mobile phones introduced in 2016
Digital audio players
Ubuntu Touch devices